3 Ships is the fourth solo album by Yes lead singer Jon Anderson, released on Elektra Records in 1985. It includes versions of traditional Christmas carols as well as original material by Anderson. The album title references the song "I Saw Three Ships", which states, "I saw three ships come sailing in, on Christmas day in the morning". It was dedicated to the organisation Beyond War. Trevor Rabin plays guitar on the album.

The 'Holiday Card Pack, Jon Anderson Special Edition' came with a personal autograph from Anderson, as well as a set of five Christmas cards. Each card displayed an image of an Anderson watercolour painting.

3 Ships was reissued on compact disc in 2007. This remastered '22nd Anniversary Edition' contains all of the album's original songs, plus five bonus tracks, two of which were previously unreleased.

Reception 
The album received only a single star from Sounds reviewer Hugh Fielder, who called it a "soppy retreat from realism". Reviewing the album for AllMusic, Dave Connolly wrote: "This is an oddity: a Christmas album incognito. Save a red and green stripe on the back cover, the outside packaging is conspicuously devoid of the usual holiday trappings, leaving the astute person to deduce from the track listing Three Ships' true intent. […] The Christmas songs are processed with synthesizers, overwhelming Anderson's voice most of the time, and the end result is a disappointing and superficial collection of Christmas classics (including one of the lamest versions of "O Holy Night" on record). As with In the City of Angels, also recorded in Hollywood, fans would do well to let Three Ships sail by."

Track listing (Original 1985 LP version) 
Side One
"Save All Your Love" 1:25
"Easier Said Than Done" 4:12
"3 Ships" 3:44
"Forest of Fire" 3:34
"Ding Dong! Merrily on High" 1:58
"Save All Your Love (Reprise)" 3:05

Side Two
"The Holly and the Ivy" 3:07
"Day of Days" 3:37
"2000 Years" 0:54
"Where Were You?" 3:57
"O Holy Night" 4:25
"How It Hits You" 5:13
"Jingle Bells" 0:30

 Note: There are incorrect timings on the original album label (side 1). "Easier Said Than Done" is incorrectly listed as 3:14, "Ding Dong! Merrily on High" as 3:36 and "Save All Your Love (Reprise)" as 2:20.

Track listing (2007 CD version) 
Tracks marked by * are bonus tracks not available on the original album.

"Give Hope" * 4:37 [recording era of this song is unknown]
"Save All Your Love" 1:22 (Anderson)
"Easier Said Than Done" 4:14 (Vangelis)
"Three Ships" 3:39 (Traditional)
"Candle Song" * 3:32 [from Jon Anderson's Change We Must album, recorded 1993-94]
"Forest of Fire" 3:33 (Anderson)
"Ding Dong Merrily on High" 1:57 (Traditional)
"Hurry Home" * 6:47 [from Jon Anderson's Change We Must album, recorded 1993-94]
"Save All Your Love (Reprise)" 3:10 (Anderson)
"The Holly and the Ivy" 3:07 (Traditional)
"Day of Days" 3:32 (Anderson)
"Ave Verum" * 3:26 [from Jon Anderson's Toltec album, recorded 1989-90]
"2,000 Years" 0:56 (Anderson)
"Where Were You?" 3:55 (Anderson)
"Oh Holy Night" 4:15 (Traditional)
"How It Hits You" 5:09 (Anderson)
"Jingle Bells" 0:32 (Traditional)
"Ray of Hope" * 6:11 [J.Anderson/M.Marshall/D.Black] 1991

Recording Credits 
Jon Anderson: Lead Vocals
"Beyond War Philharmonic" – Orchestration
Concert Master: Paul Cheng
Conducted by Bob Esty
Gospel Choir: Calvary Baptist Church, Santa Monica
Inspirational Choir, courtesy of Pastor Robert de France Jr.
Choir Director: William Bryant II
Children's Choir: "Reach for the Stars Singers"
Choir Director: Marta Woodhull
Children's Choir on "Give Hope:" Millikan Middle School, Sherman Oaks, CA
Choir Director: Leo Krubsack
Sandra Crouch & Friends: Directed by Andre and Sandra Crouch & Gary Lanier
Sandra Crouch: special guest Duet Vocals on "Oh Holy Night"
Jade Anderson: Additional Vocals on "Jingle Bells"
Rhett 'Pepsi' Lawrence: Fairlight CMI,
Mike Marshall GB: Keyboards, orchestration
Trevor Rabin and Elliot Easton: Guitar
Frankie Banali & Ric Parnell: Drums & Percussion
Paulinho da Costa: Percussion
Novi Novog: Electric Viola

Production 
Produced by Roy Thomas Baker for RTB Audio Visual Productions, U.S.A.
Engineered & Mixed by George Tutko
Assistant Engineering by Jim McMahon
Additional Mixing by Brad Gilderman
Recorded at Crystal Studios, Hollywood CA.
Production Co-ordination by Bob Keasler, assisted by Freddie Henderson & Jem Scott
Re-Issue Engineering & Mastering by Mike Pietrini
Executive Producer: Rob Ayling for Voiceprint Group of Companies
Musical Arrangements by Bob Esty except track 18, Mike Marshall GB
Art Direction and Design by KOSH & Larson
Cartography by Bob Blakeman

Charts

References

Jon Anderson albums
1985 Christmas albums
Albums produced by Roy Thomas Baker
Christmas albums by English artists
Rock Christmas albums